Castilho is a Portuguese surname. The Spanish version of this surname is Castillo. Notable people with the surname include:

Ana Augusta de Castilho (1860–1916), Portuguese activist 
Angelic Alihusain-del Castilho (born 1967), Surinamese politician
António Feliciano de Castilho (1800–1875), Portuguese writer
Carlos Castilho (1927–1987), Brazilian football goalkeeper
Guilherme Castilho (born 1999), Brazilian footballer
João de Castilho (also known as Juan de Castillo, 1470–1552), Spanish-Portuguese architect
José Mauro Volkmer de Castilho (1946–1998), Brazilian scientist 
Iury Lírio Freitas de Castilho (born 1995), Brazilian footballer

See also
Castilho, a municipality in Brazil
Castilho (disambiguation)

Portuguese-language surnames